Edgewood, also known as Higginbotham House, is a historic home located at 138 Garland Avenue in Amherst, Amherst County, Virginia.  It was built in 1818, by Arthur B. Davies a local attorney and Amherst County Court Clerk. It is a two-story, seven bay, "T"-plan brick dwelling in the Greek Revival style. It sits on an English basement and features a two-story pedimented wooden portico. Additions made in 1972 are in the Federal style. The house retains most of its original woodwork and mantels, and features murals painted by an unknown local artist. The building housed the Higginbotham Academy from 1851 to 1860, as well as the local Masonic Hall, and meeting place for a Methodist congregation.

On August 16, 2006, it was added to the National Register of Historic Places.

See also
 List of Registered Historic Places in Virginia, Counties A-B (Amherst County)
 Edgewood, 1858 (Amherst, Virginia), 591 Puppy Creek Road, also listed on the National Register

References

Houses in Amherst County, Virginia
Houses completed in 1818
Greek Revival houses in Virginia
Federal architecture in Virginia
Houses on the National Register of Historic Places in Virginia
National Register of Historic Places in Amherst County, Virginia